Feral (Maria Callasantos) is a fictional character appearing in American comic books published by Marvel Comics. She has been both a superhero and a supervillain and most recognizably associated as a member of X-Force. Feral is the sister of Thornn.

Publication history
Feral first appeared in The New Mutants #99 (March 1991), and was created by Rob Liefeld and Fabian Nicieza.

Fictional character biography
The cat-like mutant Feral attempted to escape from the tyrannical rule of the Morlock, Masque. She was saved from Masque by Cable, and agreed to join Cable's paramilitary group X-Force in return for protection.

Alongside X-Force, she first battled the Mutant Liberation Front, during which she broke Wildside's jaw. She then severely injured Cannonball during combat training. She fought her sister Thornn, when Thornn and Masque invaded X-Force Base. She next battled Sauron. Alongside X-Force, she battled Weapon P.R.I.M.E. She was later compelled by the Druid to go to Starkesboro, Massachusetts.

During the X-Cutioner's Song saga, she was attacked by the X-Men and X-Factor alongside X-Force. She was captured by Wolverine, and was taken prisoner with X-Force by the X-Men and X-Factor. Feral later received a new costume, and left Xavier's mansion with the rest of X-Force. With X-Force, she then fought Nick Fury and War Machine.

Feral was always the ticking time bomb of X-Force especially when it came to teammate Siryn, barely capable of controlling her deadly temper. Prior to joining the group, it was later revealed that Maria and her sister Lucia (who later became known as Thornn) had to leave home and lived with the Morlocks. It was later discovered that both girls had been abused by their cocaine addict stepfather; in retaliation, Feral killed the man and shoved his body into the wall. Her mother, who was also addicted to cocaine, found out and sought vengeance on the girl by killing all of her pet pigeons. This infuriated Feral to the point where she also killed her mother in a fit of rage. It was also hinted that she purposely pushed their younger sister down the stairs, leading to her death, as well as allowed their younger brother to fall to his death from their roof. Ultimately, Feral betrayed X-Force and became the enemy of her former teammates when she was convinced to join the terrorist group known as the Mutant Liberation Front, although her alliances would continue to shift.

After a brief stint with the MLF, Feral emerged from hiding when the New York City police captured Thornn. Thornn revealed that she had seen Feral kill Harry Bellinger, their mother's boyfriend. Cannonball provoked Feral into admitting that she had murdered her mother. Cannonball overpowered Feral, and an old friend of Lucia's, police detective Jose Hidalgo, arrested her for killing three members of her family and Bellinger. During her jail time, Feral discovered she was infected with the Legacy Virus. She was either unable to be convicted or escaped, as she was next seen trying to obtain Isotope E (along with other virus sufferers) as a possible cure from the High Evolutionary.

Feral, now mentally distraught from her illness later resurfaced with a new incarnation of the Hellions led by King Bedlam. Although the team's criminal activities were limited to stealing the Armageddon Man to use him as a weapon, Feral left her mark.  All of the rage that she had felt for Siryn in the past boiled over in an argument where Feral sliced through Siryn's vocal cords, incapacitating her powers.

After being cured from the virus, Feral apparently had a change of heart. She, as well as her sister Thornn, were recruited to be members of the Mumbai branch of the X-Corporation along with her former teammate Warpath and Sunfire. The team helped save Professor X from an assassination attempt by a crazed Lilandra Neramani, who still believed that Charles Xavier was Cassandra Nova.

She stayed with X-Corp for quite some time, but she returned to New York after M-Day, where the Scarlet Witch caused the mutant gene to disappear from 90-95% of the mutant population worldwide, making them "baseline humans". Both Feral and her sister were depowered and in Mutant Town, looking for answers.

They both traveled to Wakanda where both sisters met up with other feral heroes such as Sasquatch and Wolfsbane. As a group, the four of them were to aid Wolverine in his search for his longtime foe Sabretooth. During the group's investigation to find Sabretooth, both Feral and Thornn are kidnapped by the enigmatic geneticist Romulus, a 2,000 year old mutant. Romulus specializes in feral mutations preferring wolf-based entities such as individuals like Wolfsbane. Despite Feral and Thornn's cat-like exteriors, the girls are put under extreme experiments that changed them on the genetic level.

The sisters woke up and found that they were in a Weapon X experiment facility, and remembered nothing of the events that brought them there. Though not feeling any different except for their slight amnesia, they were more than surprised when they got up and looked at each other, the sisters realize that their bodies had been tampered with as they only saw their once mutant forms; cat-like in appearance. Whatever had been done to them had, in their beliefs, reversed their depowering and they were both mutants again.

Fighting Sabretooth
Their memories however, began to slowly come back when Wolverine appeared. He was surprised to see their visages but gladly accepted the additional power that their mutant forms carried, should they wish to continue. Feral chose to proceed, ecstatic in the chance to use her powers again. Now that Wolverine had finally found and secured the sisters he could continue his search for Sabretooth. The two continued to search the facility they were in. With so many hallways and doors they inadvertently got separated. While alone, Feral stumbled upon Sabretooth. He was very different, more animalistic, even more so than normal. Confident in her skills, she willingly confronted him. In such close quarters and Sabretooth in his apparently mindless state, she found the truth about her powers far too late. Sabretooth killed her. Wolverine arrived right after Sabretooth killed her, and later killed Sabretooth by beheading him.

In the end, the team regrouped. With Feral dead, it was then speculated by Wolfsbane that the sisters were still baseline humans. Only their outward appearances had been changed back to their once feline forms. Wolverine agreed, as it explained why she lost so easily. It appeared that Romulus only reverted their physical forms back to their previous mutant forms without actually granting them their mutant powers. Feral's life came full circle; she was murdered in cold blood by a feral mutant in a berserker state as she in a similar state did to much of her family in her youth.

Despite the fact that she had lost her powers prior to her death, Feral was resurrected and repowered by means of the Transmode Virus to serve as part of Selene's army of deceased mutants.  Under the control of Selene and Eli Bard, she took part in the assault on the mutant nation of Utopia and was seen attacking X-23 and Dr. James Bradley.

Hassling Wolfsbane
Later as Shatterstar and Wolfsbane defeated a demon calling itself a Sin-Eater at a local church, the two are about to leave when they encounter Feral waiting outside the church. Feral wants to get Wolfsbane's unborn baby for herself, even if she has to kill Rahne Sinclair to get it. Feral's attack fails as she passes through Wolfsbane's body, and Rahne reminds her that Feral is dead. Feral does not believe it but feels something is wrong about herself, and vanishes when she realizes that she is dead. She later materializes, with her memories intact in the taxi Rahne and Shatterstar are riding, as they are being chased by their enemies. She reveals that there are many supernatural entities, specifically animal-type gods with dog and cat forms, now after Rahne's hybrid unborn baby. They are using Maria's spirit as a homing beacon on Rahne as she was once part of the human world when she was still alive, with the promise that they will reward her service to them by fully resurrecting her.

Years later, Feral was resurrected by the Five and resides on Krakoa alongside other mutants including her former teammates of X-Force.

Powers and abilities
She formerly had a feline mutation that endowed her with a thin layer of light orange fur covering her body, sharp claws and fangs, pointed ears, superhumanly acute senses including night vision and sense of smell, enhanced strength, speed, agility, reflexes, coordination, balance, and endurance paired with enhanced healing capabilities as well as a prehensile tail. Feral was depowered during M-Day. She was repowered when she was briefly resurrected during Necrosha.

Feral was a fierce hand-to-hand combatant, trained in unarmed combat by Cable. She was also an excellent hunter and tracker.

Reception
 In 2014, Entertainment Weekly ranked Feral 26th in their "Let's rank every X-Man ever" list.

Other versions

Age of Apocalypse
Feral appeared in the follow-up limited series to the 1995-96 "Age of Apocalypse", Feral is introduced as a member of the Morlocks.

House of M
She later appeared in the 2005 "House of M" storyline as a member of the strike-force known as the Brotherhood.

Ultimate Marvel
In the Ultimate Marvel reality, Feral appears as a member of the Mutant Liberation Front.

X-Men '92
Feral is part of a group of mutants called Rej-X. She later joined X-Force, along with Shatterstar.

In other media

Television
 Feral made cameos in the X-Men episodes "Slave Island" and "Graduation Day". In "Slave Island", Feral is among the mutants enslaved on Genosha. In "Graduation Day", Feral was with Sunfire and some unnamed mutants when they watched Henry Peter Gyrich's attack on Professor X. The two of them talked about this incident. She was also with Sunfire when he and the other mutants on Genosha wanted Magneto to lead them against the humans.
 A mutant that resembles a hairless version of Feral made a cameo in Wolverine and the X-Men episode "X-Calibur".
 Feral appears in the Wolverine versus Sabretooth motion comic, voiced by Kathleen Barr.

References

External links
 Feral at Marvel.com
 Uncannyxmen.net bio on Feral

Characters created by Fabian Nicieza
Characters created by Rob Liefeld
Comics characters introduced in 1991
Fictional characters from New York City
Fictional characters with superhuman senses
Fictional murderers
Fictional werecats
Marvel Comics characters with accelerated healing
Marvel Comics characters with superhuman strength
Marvel Comics female superheroes
Marvel Comics female supervillains
Marvel Comics martial artists
Marvel Comics mutants
New Mutants